Doliops geometrica is a species of beetle in the family Cerambycidae. It was described by Waterhouse in 1842.

References

Doliops
Beetles described in 1842